Alaria may refer to:
 Alaria (alga), a brown alga genus in the family Alariaceae
 Alaria (trematode), a flatworm genus in the family Diplostomatidae